Brian Stanley may refer ro:

 Brian Stanley (historian), historian of Christian missions and world Christianity
 Brian Stanley (politician), Irish Sinn Féin politician